Mengesha is an Ethiopian male given name and surname. It derives from the Aramaic "Mengus," which means "king," "kingdom," or "of ruling."

Given name 

 Mengesha Seyoum (born 1927), member of the imperial family of the Ethiopian Empire
 Ras Mengesha Yohannes (1868–1906), governor of Tigray
 Stefanos Mengesha Seyoum (born 1952), prince of Ethiopia

Surname 

 Araya Mengesha, Canadian actor
 Milkesa Mengesha (born 2000), Ethiopian athlete
 Nigist Mengesha, Ethiopian-Israeli community activist and social worker
 Seyoum Mengesha (1887–1960), Ethiopian army commander and member of the royal family of the Ethiopian Empire
 Taddele Mengesha, Ethiopian footballer
 Weyni Mengesha, Canadian director

References 

Ethiopian given names